Route 82 is a highway in southwest Missouri.  Its eastern terminus is at Route 83 in northwest Hickory County; its western terminus is at U.S. Route 54 in El Dorado Springs.

From 1922 to about 1927, Route 82 west of Osceola was part of Route 26, which ran from the Kansas state line east to Osceola. It became part of US 54 west of El Dorado Springs in 1926 or 1927, and the eastern half was renumbered Route 62. When US 62 was extended into Missouri in the early 1930s, Route 62 became Route 82.

Route description

History

Major intersections

References

082
Transportation in Cedar County, Missouri
Transportation in St. Clair County, Missouri
Transportation in Hickory County, Missouri
Transportation in Benton County, Missouri